Leopold Ernst von Firmian (1708–1783) was an Austrian bishop and cardinal.

He was Bishop of Seckau from 1739 to 1763, campaigning against Protestantism. He also acted as coadjutor bishop or administrator of the Bishopric of Trento, from 1748 to 1758. As Prince-Bishop of Passau from 1763 to 1783, he was a more tolerant reforming Catholic. He became Cardinal of S. Pietro in Montorio in 1772.

Family 
His parents were Baron Franz Alfons Georg von Firmian and Countess Barbara Elisabeth von Thun. Leopold Anton Freiherr von Firmian, archbishop of Salzburg, was his uncle. His younger brother was the Austrian plenipotentiary of Milan, Charles Joseph von Firmian.

Notes

References 
 Alessandro Cont, Leopoldo Ernesto Firmian (1708-1783) e l'arcidiocesi di Salisburgo, “Annali dell’Istituto storico italo-germanico in Trento”, 32 (2006), pp. 71-126.

External links 
 Catholic Hierarchy page 
 Biography
 aeiou page

18th-century Austrian cardinals
People from Trento
1708 births
1783 deaths
Bishops of Graz-Seckau